International Sociology is a peer-reviewed academic journal covering the field of sociology. The editor-in-chief is Marta Soler Gallart (Universitat de Barcelona). It was established in 1986 and is published by SAGE Publications on behalf of the International Sociological Association. The journal publishes both theoretical and empirical papers using qualitative and quantitative approaches.

Abstracting and indexing
The journal is abstracted and indexed in:

According to the Journal Citation Reports, the journal has a 2016 impact factor of 0.741.

References

External links
 

SAGE Publishing academic journals
English-language journals
Publications established in 1986
Sociology journals
Bimonthly journals